Olcostephanidae is an extinct ammonoid cephalopod family belonging to the superfamily Perisphinctoidea. These fast-moving nektonic carnivores lived from the Jurassic to the Cretaceous period.

Genera
Bihenduloceras
Olcostephanus Neumayr, 1875
Saynoceras
Subastieria Spath, 1923
Taraisites Canta-Chapa, 1966
Valanginites Sayn, 1910

Distribution
Fossils of species within this genus have been found in the Cretaceous sediments of Antarctica, Argentina, Austria, Chile, Colombia, Czech Republic, Czechoslovakia, France, Hungary, Italy, Mexico, Morocco, Peru, Poland, Portugal, Romania, Slovakia, South Africa, Spain, Russia, United States, as well as in the Jurassic of Argentina and Mexico.

References

Ammonitida families
Perisphinctoidea
Cretaceous ammonites
Ammonites of Europe
Tithonian first appearances
Early Cretaceous extinctions